Leonard Gilchrist Wilson (born June 11, 1928, Orillia, Ontario, Canada – April 3, 2018, Oakdale, Minnesota) was a Canadian-American historian of science, specializing in the history of medicine and biology and the history of nineteenth century geology. He is best known for his 1972 biography of Charles Lyell.

Biography
Leonard G. Wilson grew up in Orillia, Ontario. He graduated in 1949 with a bachelor's degree in biology from the University of Toronto. From 1950 to 1953 he taught as a lecturer at Mount Allison University in Sackville, New Brunswick. In 1955 he graduated with an M.Sc. from the University of London. He received his Ph.D. in 1958 from the University of Wisconsin–Madison. His Ph.D. thesis is entitled Theories of respiration in the seventeenth century. As a postdoc he was from 1958 to 1959 a visiting instructor in the history department of the University of California, Berkeley. From 1959 to 1960 he was an assistant professor in the history department of Cornell University. In the department of history of science and medicine of the Yale University School of Medicine, he was from 1960 to 1965 an assistant professor  and 1965 to 1967 an associate professor. In the history of medicine department of the University of Minnesota, Wilson was a full professor and head of the department from 1967 until his retirement in 2001 as professor emeritus. He was the editor-in-chief of the Journal of the History of Medicine and Allied Sciences from 1973 to 1982. His successor as editor-in-chief was Robert J. T. Joy.

Wilson wrote many articles and book reviews about topics in the history of medicine and biology. He was particularly enthusiastic about the history of geology as it developed in the nineteenth century. He made several geological field trips in connection with his historical research. In addition to his internationally recognized works on Charles Lyell, he published on the history of "the species question, Archibald Geikie and the elevation of Scotland, and Lord Kelvin’s estimates of the age of the Earth."

Wilson was for the academic year 1984–1985 the president of the Minnesota Academy of Medicine. He was elected in 1987 a fellow of the American Association for the Advancement of Science. He received the 2013 Mary C. Rabbitt History And Philosophy of Geology Award from the Geological Society of America.

In June 1969 he married Adelia Katherine Hans (1937–2015). George Edward Hans Wilson, their only child, became the father of two children.

Selected publications

Articles

Books

References

External links
 
  WorldCat database entry

1928 births
2018 deaths
20th-century Canadian historians
21st-century Canadian historians
American historians of science
University of Toronto alumni
Alumni of the University of London
University of Wisconsin–Madison alumni
Yale School of Medicine faculty
University of Minnesota faculty
Fellows of the American Association for the Advancement of Science
People from Orillia